"Stay" is a song by Norwegian DJ and record producer Kygo, featuring American singer Maty Noyes. The song was produced by Kygo with fellow Norwegian, William Wiik Larsen, who also wrote it with Noyes. It was released as the fourth single from Kygo's debut studio album, Cloud Nine (2016). An official music video for the song was released on 18 February 2016.

Background
After writing what would eventually become "Stay", Noyes discovered Kygo through a remix he did of Marvin Gaye's 1982 single "Sexual Healing". Noyes liked Kygo's remix and "figured he could do something with this song", so she talked to her manager, Phoenix Stone, about the possibility of working with Kygo. Stone mentioned that an A&R executive had heard "Angel"—a track Noyes did with The Weeknd for the latter's debut album Beauty Behind the Madness (2015)—and was now looking for another song for Kygo to work on. According to Noyes, "We sent [the demo] to them and one of his people in his team was playing it for him in his hotel room and he said, automatically, "Send me this I want to do it right now." It worked out really quickly. He had it done within a few days and he said it was one of the fastest songs he ever finished. It was meant to be."

Live performances
Kygo and Noyes gave their first live performance of the song at the Nobel Peace Prize Concert on December 11, 2015.

In October 2016, Noyes missed a live gig through illness and Kygo's manager, Myles Shear, banned her from performing at the Hollywood Bowl with him as a result. He later apologised.

Music video
The music video was directed by Jason Beattie. It follows the topsy-turvy relationship of a lesbian couple.

Charts

Weekly charts

Year-end charts

Certifications

Release history

References

2015 singles
2015 songs
Sony Music singles
Maty Noyes songs
Kygo songs
Song recordings produced by Kygo
Songs written by Kygo
Songs written by Maty Noyes
Songs written by William Wiik Larsen